Poolburn is a small rural settlement in Central Otago, in the South Island of New Zealand. It is located in the Ida Valley nine kilometres to the southeast of Ophir.
It has a primary school, a former hotel, a community hall, a sports ground, tennis courts and a (closed) church.
It has nearby historic gold mine workings ("Blacks No. 3") at the eastern foot of the Raggedy Range.

 Populated places in Otago